Jacqueline Scott Corley (née Jacqueline Marie Scott, born 1966) is a United States district judge of the United States District Court for the Northern District of California. She served as a United States magistrate judge of the same court from 2011 to 2022.

Education
Corley graduated from the University of California, Berkeley with an undergraduate degree in 1988, and in 1991, graduated with her Juris Doctor degree magna cum laude from Harvard Law School, where she was also an editor and articles chair on the Harvard Law Review.

Career
Upon graduation from law school, Corley served as a judicial law clerk for Judge Robert E. Keeton of the United States District Court for the District of Massachusetts.

She then practiced with the law firm of Goodwin Procter in Boston focusing on white collar criminal defense as well as complex commercial civil litigation. Corley then worked as a litigation associate at the firm of Coblentz, Patch, Duffy & Bass LLP in San Francisco.

From 1998 to 2009, Corley served as the permanent law clerk to Judge Charles Breyer of the United States District Court for the Northern District of California. She has also served on the Northern District of California Alternative Dispute Resolution mediation and early neutral evaluation panels from 2006 to 2007 though her appointment in 2011.

From 2009 to 2011, Corley was a partner at the law firm of Kerr & Wagstaffe in San Francisco, where she had a focus on federal practice as a civil litigator. At Kerr & Wagstaffe, Corley represented government entities, individuals and institutions as plaintiffs and defendants in various cases involving patent, copyright, trademark, defamation, constitutional law, malicious prosecution, class action, contract and probate legal issues.

Federal judicial service

United States magistrate judge service 

On May 18, 2011, Corley was appointed as a United States magistrate judge of the Northern District of California. She took her seat vacated by Judge Edward M. Chen, who was elevated to a district court judge in 2011. Corley also served as the Northern District of California's Alternative Dispute Resolution (ADR) Magistrate Judge, in charge of coordinating the ADR program with the Court during her time as a magistrate judge. Her service as a magistrate judge was terminated on March 30, 2022 when she was elevated as a district judge.

District court service 

On November 3, 2021, President Joe Biden nominated Corley to serve as a United States district judge of the United States District Court for the Northern District of California. President Biden nominated Corley to the seat vacated by Judge William Alsup, who assumed senior status on January 21, 2021. On December 1, 2021, a hearing on her nomination was held before the Senate Judiciary Committee. On January 3, 2022, her nomination was returned to the President under Rule XXXI, Paragraph 6 of the United States Senate; she was later renominated the same day. On January 13, 2022, her nomination was reported out of committee by a 16–6 vote. On March 16, 2022, the Senate invoked cloture on her nomination by a 63–35 vote. On March 17, 2022, her  nomination was confirmed by a 63–36 vote. She received her judicial commission on March 30, 2022.

References

External links

The Honorable Jacqueline Scott Corley, U.S. Magistrate Judge, United States District Court for the Northern District of California

1966 births
Living people
20th-century American women lawyers
20th-century American lawyers
21st-century American judges
21st-century American women lawyers
21st-century American lawyers
21st-century American women judges
Harvard Law School alumni
Judges of the United States District Court for the Northern District of California
People from Long Beach, California
Lawyers from San Francisco
United States district court judges appointed by Joe Biden
United States magistrate judges
University of California, Berkeley alumni